Microdactylon is a genus of plants in the Apocynaceae first described as a genus in 1908. It contains only one known species, Microdactylon cordatum, native to the States of Puebla and Oaxaca in Mexico.

References

Asclepiadoideae
Monotypic Apocynaceae genera
Endemic flora of Mexico
Flora of Oaxaca
Flora of Puebla
Taxa named by Townshend Stith Brandegee